Matej Rakovan (born 14 March 1990) is a Slovak football goalkeeper, who most recently played for Trinity Zlín.

Career
Rakovan signed a two-year contract with Dundee United in June 2018. He was released from his contract on 23 January 2019  

On 30 January 2019, Rakovan signed a contract until the end of 2020 with FC Fastav Zlín.

External links

References

1990 births
Living people
Slovak footballers
Association football goalkeepers
MŠK Žilina players
MFK Tatran Liptovský Mikuláš players
MFK Karviná players
SK Slavia Prague players
FC Vysočina Jihlava players
Dundee United F.C. players
FC Fastav Zlín players
Czech First League players
Scottish Professional Football League players
Expatriate footballers in the Czech Republic
Expatriate footballers in Scotland
Sportspeople from Žilina
Slovak expatriate footballers
Slovakia under-21 international footballers